Jade Chynoweth (born August 21, 1998) is an American actress and dancer. 

She is known for her roles as young Artemisia in the 2014 epic action film 300: Rise of an Empire and Carmen in the 2016 superhero film Batman v Superman: Dawn of Justice, for her recurring role as Kathleen Nolan on the TNT television series The Last Ship and Odalie Allen on the Starz/YouTube Premium series Step Up.

Biography
She first appeared as the Street Dancer in 2012 comedy musical series Dr. Fubalous. Her debut film role was as young Artemisia in the 2014 epic historical fantasy war film 300: Rise of an Empire.

In December 2018, she appeared on The Voice dancing while singer Halsey performed her song "Without Me". The performance received backlash for how Halsey "sensually" danced with Chynoweth; the backlash in turn was criticized as homophobic and Halsey defended her performance.

Filmography

References

External links

1998 births
Living people
American actresses
American female dancers
American child actresses
21st-century American women